Chameleon is a 1998 science fiction action film television movie, written by Bennett Cohen and directed by Stuart Cooper. This is the first film of a trilogy and was followed by Chameleon II: Death Match and Chameleon 3: Dark Angel. Chameleon was originally aired on October 22, 1998 on UPN.

Plot
Kam (Bobbie Phillips) is a genetic creation, made to be a super killer. She, however, discovers her maternal instincts while trying to protect a child from government.

Cast
 Bobbie Phillips as Kam
 Eric Lloyd as Ghen, Aede's Son
 John Adam as Quinn, Former IBI Agent
 Jerome Ehlers as 'Maddy' Madison
 Nicholas Bell as Mozser, Cam's Controller

Reception
Jim McLennan from "Girls with Guns" wrote: "The action here seems restrained; a little gunplay and some minor martial arts, but nothing particularly memorable. The sexual scenes make the made-for-TV origins painfully clear, with sheets that appear to be velcro'd to Phillips’ breasts, when she doesn't have her elbows elegantly positioned in front of them. Still, there's enough here in the central character to make me want to see more...and lo, what's this coming along?" Charles Tatum from "Tatum Reviews Archive" gave the film two out of five stars and wrote: "The story has been done to death, and the film makers cannot decide which audience they want to go for- switching sex scenes with cutesy scenes between the killer cyborg and the adorable kid that are lifted right out of Terminator 2. Space Maggot applauds Phillips, and shoots a vote of 3". Nathan Rabin from The A.V. Club said: "For better or worse, but mainly for worse, Chameleon pounces upon virtually every futuristic-android cliché known to humanity. But what's even more damaging than the film's lack of originality is its moribund pace, which robs it of what little energy it possesses. Even as leering masturbation fodder, Chameleon is a dud, as Cooper's main contribution as a director seems to be his incredible ability to film sex scenes in a way that titillates no one and covers more flesh than a convent in Alaska". Robert Pardi from TV Guide, gave the film two out four stars.

Chameleon was nominated for two awards. One "OFTA Television Award" for "Best Makeup/Hairstyling in a Motion Picture or Miniseries" and one Young Artist Award for "Best Performance in a TV Movie/Pilot/Mini-Series or Series - Supporting Young Actor" for Eric Lloyd.

See also
 List of television films produced for UPN

References

External links
 

1998 television films
1998 films
1998 action films
1998 science fiction films
1990s American films
1990s English-language films
1990s science fiction action films
Action television films
American science fiction action films
American science fiction television films
Television pilots not picked up as a series
UPN original films